Creative Control may refer to:
 Artistic control, the authority to decide how a final media product will appear
 Creative Control (business), a New York-based online TV network
 Creative control (business), a Los Angeles-based music supervision company
 Creative Control TV, an online TV network
 Creative Control (film), a 2015 film directed by Benjamin Dickinson
 The Harris Brothers, a professional wrestling tag team who used the stage name Creative Control